The Chronological Classics series consists of 965 jazz compact discs compiled by Gilles Pétard in France. Classics Records is a record company and label founded by Pétard in Paris in c. 1989. The company also reissued recording by Rhythm & blues artists in a series which ran to 190 CDs.

The label set out to assemble comprehensive collections of jazz recordings by hundreds of artists previously issued on 78 rpm records, as European copyright laws allowed (issued recordings are protected for 50 years) and issue them on compact disc. The series was issued with discographical details and in colour-coordinated packaging. Classics largely concentrating on reissuing American jazz, while the American record companies were not producing their own editions of early jazz on anything like this scale. Classics had several European rivals in the early 1990s such as Masters of Jazz and Jazz Archives.

The series was initially distributed by subscription, with five issues being released each month. The series began with number 500 in December 1989. The initial release was Ella Fitzgerald 1935–1937. The series contains the output of the greatest jazz musicians up to the early 1950s, including Louis Armstrong, Count Basie, Duke Ellington, and Benny Goodman, as well as lesser known artists, such as Jabbo Smith, Claude Hopkins and Tiny Parham.

The Classics label regularly issued new collections until 2004, when its original distributor went bankrupt. The back catalogue was then acquired by Abeille Musique, which operated the label until July 2008. Five titles announced for an August 2008 release were never issued. Many of the titles have also been given a digital release under the label 'Complete Jazz Series' and are available on streaming services.

For many years the cover of the CDs contained a typographical error. Instead of "Chronological", the typo at the top said "Chronogical". This mistake was corrected only in 2005, and a new logotype is used on the disc covers since number 1380 (Dizzy Gillespie 1953).

Discography

References

External links
Chronological Classics at Abeille Musique
Chronological Classics' Project

French record labels
Jazz record labels
Reissue record labels
Record labels established in 1989
1989 establishments in France